Dick Stockton was the defending champion, but lost in the first round.

Jimmy Connors won the title, defeating Roscoe Tanner, 6–2, 6–4, 6–3 in the final.

Seeds

  Jimmy Connors (champion)
  Björn Borg (quarterfinals)
  Brian Gottfried (semifinals)
  Vitas Gerulaitis (third round)
  Manuel Orantes (third round)
  Eddie Dibbs (semifinals)
  Raúl Ramírez (quarterfinals)
  Ilie Năstase (third round)
  Dick Stockton (first round)
  Roscoe Tanner (final)
  Corrado Barazzutti (first round)
  Ken Rosewall (third round)
  Wojtek Fibak (third round)
  Harold Solomon (third round)
  Sandy Mayer (quarterfinals)
  John McEnroe (quarterfinals)

Draw

Finals

Top half

Section 1

Section 2

Bottom half

Section 3

Section 4

External links
 Main draw

U.S. Pro Indoor
1978 Grand Prix (tennis)